J. Brooks (full name and dates of birth and death unknown) was an English cricketer.  Brooks' batting style is unknown, but it is known he was a medium pace bowler, although the arm he bowled with is not known.

Brooks made a single first-class appearance for Gloucestershire against Sussex in the 1892 County Championship.  In this match, he was dismissed twice for a duck, with him being bowled by Fred Tate in Gloucestershire's first-innings, while in their second-innings he was run out.  In Sussex's first-innings he bowled 6 overs, taking the wicket of Frank Guttridge for 31 runs from those 6 overs. A contemporary report described him as "one of the ground staff at Bristol"; he took the place of William Woof.

References

External links
J. Brooks at ESPNcricinfo
J. Brooks at CricketArchive

English cricketers
Gloucestershire cricketers